Curling at the 2017 European Youth Olympic Winter Festival was held from February to February 7 at the Milli Piyango Curling Arena in Erzurum, Turkey.

Medal summary

Medal table

Medalists

Boys

Teams 

(source:)

Round-robin standings 
Official Round-robin standings

Round-robin results 
All draw times are listed in (UTC+3).

Draw 1 
Monday, February 13, 19:00

Draw 2 
Tuesday February 14, 13:00

Draw 3 
Wednesday February 15, 9:00

Wednesday February 15, 17:00

Draw 4 
Thursday February 16, 13:00

Playoffs

Semifinals 

Friday, February 17, 9:00

Bronze Medal Game 

Friday, February 17, 14:30

Gold Medal Game 

Friday, February 17, 14:30

Final standings

Girls

Teams 

(source:)

Round-robin standings 
Official Round-robin standings

Round-robin results 
All draw times are listed in (UTC+3).

Draw 1 
Monday, February 13, 15:00

Draw 2 
Tuesday February 14, 9:00

Tuesday February 14, 17:00

Draw 3 
Wednesday February 15, 13:00

Draw 4 
Thursday February 16, 9:00

Playoffs

Semifinals 

Friday, February 17, 9:00

Bronze Medal Game 

Friday, February 17, 14:30

Gold Medal Game 

Friday, February 17, 14:30

Final standings

References

External links
Results Book – Curling

European Youth Olympic Winter Festival
Curling in Turkey
2017 European Youth Olympic Winter Festival events
2017
International curling competitions hosted by Turkey
2017 in Turkish sport